Fan Milk is a Ghana based manufacturer and retailer of ice cream and frozen dairy products, In July 2019, Danone, previously a joint shareholder with The Abraaj Group, increased its stake to 100% and thus assumed complete ownership of the company.

History

Fan Milk Limited is a Ghanaian dairy retailer based in Accra that's listed on the Ghana Stock Exchange and the GSE All-Share Index. Since its inception in 1960 the company has commenced operations in Benin, Togo and Burkina Faso. Previously known as the Ghanaian Milk Company, they ascertained Danish investment in the early 1960s and initially specialized in pasteurised milk. However, in 1962, the company changed its name to Fan Milk Limited and branched out into the production of ice cream, yoghurt, ice lollies and other frozen dairy products.

Fan Milk Limited was the first foreign-invested company in Ghana to become a Public Limited Liability in 1967 and among the first companies to be listed on the Ghana Stock Exchange on 18 October 1991 with the symbol FML. As of 2003, it had over 3,250 shareholders.

Ownership
As of December 2003, Fan Milk's top shareholders were Fan Milk International Denmark with 7,365,955 shares as in 37.23%, the Danish Industrialization Fund For Developing Countries with 4,954,420 shares as in 25.04%, and Enterprise Insurance with 1,978,472 shares being 10% of the company. At that stage Fan Milk International Denamrk, the Danish Industrialization Fund for Developing Companies and Enterprise Insurance each owned a 37.23%, 25.04% and 10% stake of Fan Milk Ghana respectively.

In 2013, The Abraaj Group and Danone became joint owners of Fan Milk, obtaining a 51% and 49% stake in the company, respectively.
 Danone eventually became a majority shareholder in 2016. On July 30, 2019, Danone acquired Abraaj's remaining 49% shares, increasing its stake to 100% and thus assuming complete ownership of the company.

Products

Fanice (150mL Pouch)
FanGold
FanYogo (Strawberry, mango & passion)
FanChoco
FanDango
FanVanille (Togo, Benin)
 Fanmaxx (Ghana)
 FanYogo (Strawberry, Banana Flavour)

References

External links
Fan Milk Limited Official Website

Google Finance listing for Fan Milk
Fan Milk at Alacrastore
Fanmilk Ghana PLC Official website

Food and drink companies of Ghana
Ice cream brands
Companies based in Accra
Food and drink companies established in 1960
Companies listed on the Ghana Stock Exchange
Nigerian companies established in 1960